A double referendum was held in Liechtenstein on 7 September 1980. Voters were asked whether they approved of the construction of a House of Arts and a national conference centre. The House of Arts was approved by 50.4% of voters, whilst the conference centre was rejected by 52.9% of voters.

Results

Construction of a House of Art

Construction of a national conference centre

References

1980 referendums
1980 in Liechtenstein
1980
September 1980 events in Europe